Robert Henry Prowse (1828 – 1924) was a merchant and political figure in Newfoundland. He represented Burgeo-LaPoile in the Newfoundland and Labrador House of Assembly from 1855 to 1859.

He was born in Port de Grave, the son of Robert Prowse and Jane Woodley, and was educated at Acadia College and the University of Edinburgh. Prowse married Jean McLea. He served as consul for Germany in Newfoundland. He was also a director for the St. John's Gas Light Company and president of the Chamber of Commerce.

His brother Daniel Woodley also served in the Newfoundland assembly.

References 
 

Members of the Newfoundland and Labrador House of Assembly
1828 births
1924 deaths
Newfoundland Colony people